Jonathan Haslam (born 15 January 1951) is George F. Kennan Professor in the School of Historical Studies at the Institute for Advanced Study in Princeton and Professor of the History of International Relations at the University of Cambridge with a special interest in the former Soviet Union.  He has written many books about Soviet foreign policy and ideology.

Education and career
Haslam studied at the London School of Economics (B.Sc.Econ 1972), Trinity College, Cambridge (M.Litt. 1978), and was awarded his Ph.D. at the University of Birmingham in 1984.  He has lectured at many institutions including: the University of Birmingham 1975–1984; Johns Hopkins University, 1984–1986; University of California, Berkeley, 1987–1988; King's College, Cambridge, 1988–1992; Yale University 1996; Harvard University, 2001; Stanford University, 1986–1987, 1994, 2005; and the University of Cambridge 1991–2015. Haslam joined the faculty of the School of Historical Studies at the Institute for Advanced Study on July 1, 2015.

Most of Haslam's works deal with the history of the Soviet Union.  During his tenure at the University of Cambridge, he wrote: "My first political memory was the Cuban missile crisis of 1962. It was the only time I saw my father afraid as he thought it entirely possible–through his London contacts–that we would all be blown up. Now I know how close we came. I have thus spent most of my life in pursuit of an explanation for the Cold War by focusing on the Soviet Union."

Bibliography
 The Spectre of War: International Communism and the Origins of World War II. Princeton, NJ: Princeton University Press, 2021, 
 Near and Distant Neighbors: A New History of Soviet Intelligence. New York: Farrar, Straus and Giroux, 2015, 
 Russia's Cold War: From the October Revolution to the Fall of the Wall. New Haven: Yale University Press, 2011, 
 The Nixon Administration and the Death of Allende's Chile: A Case of Assisted Suicide. London, New York: Verso, 2005,  
 No Virtue Like Necessity: Realist Thought in International Relations Since Machiavelli. Yale University Press, 2002.
 The Soviet Union and the Threat from the East. Pittsburgh, PA: University of Pittsburgh Press, 1992, 
 The Soviet Union and the Politics of Nuclear Weapons in Europe, 1969–87. Ithaca, NY: Cornell University Press, 1990, 
 The Soviet Union and the Struggle for Collective Security in Europe, 1933–39. New York: St. Martin's Press, 1984, 
 Soviet Foreign Policy, 1930–33: The Impact of the Depression. New York: St. Martin's Press, 1983,

References

Further reading
 Haslam, Jonathan. "The Road Taken: International Relations as History" (H-DIPLO, 2020) online autobiographical statement
 Samuels, Warren J. "'Burk's' Troublemaker: The Life and History of A. J. P. Taylor and Haslam's The Vice of Integrity: E. H. Carr, 1892–1982." Research in the History of Economic Thought & Methodology (2004), Vol. 22, pp. 291–315.

External links
 Home page of  Jonathan Haslam at The Institute for Advanced Study
 Home page of Jonathan Haslam at University of Cambridge
 Curriculum vitae of Jonathan Haslam at the Institute for Advanced Study

21st-century American historians
21st-century American male writers
Alumni of the London School of Economics
Alumni of Trinity College, Cambridge
Alumni of the University of Birmingham
Fellows of Corpus Christi College, Cambridge
Institute for Advanced Study faculty
Members of the University of Cambridge faculty of history
Johns Hopkins University faculty
University of California, Berkeley faculty
Yale University faculty
Stanford University faculty
Harvard University faculty
Academics of the University of Birmingham
Living people
1951 births
Historians from California
American male non-fiction writers